Hiru TV (Sinhala: හිරු ටීවී) is No. 1 television channel in Sri Lanka, founded by Rayynor Silva (Chairman) and owned by Asia Broadcasting Corporation. Hiru TV is Sri Lanka's first and only digital television channel which has the DVB-T2 pictures and stereo sounds. It currently holds all island coverage. Its programme content includes: Teledramas, International TV Series, Music, Movies, Documentaries, Entertainment, Political, Children's Programmes and News.

Programming

International TV series broadcast
 Yeh Un Dinon Ki Baat Hai as Season Ticket
 Silsila Badalte Rishton Ka as Sihinayaka Seya
 Choti Sarrdaarni as Sith Ahase Aadaren
 Shubharambh as As Dekata Horen
 Anupamaa as Anupama
 Adını Feriha Koydum as Ruma
 Camelot - season 1, 2
 Merlin - season 1, 2, 3, 4, 5
 Strike Back - season 1, 2, 3, 4
 Atlantis - season 1, 2
 Sinbad 
 Game of Thrones - season 1, 2, 3, 4
 The Flash - season 1, 2
 Arrow - season 1, 2, 3, 4
 Agents of S.H.I.E.L.D. - season 1
 Ek Hasina Thi as Sulanga Wage Awidin 
 Jodha Akbar as Jodha Akbar
 Prem Ya Paheli – Chandrakanta as Sandata Diwura Kyannam 
 Ek Tha Raja Ek Thi Rani as Heenayakda Me 
 Udaan as Doni 
 Baal Veer as Soorayangeth Sooraya 
 Kumkum Bhagya as Adareyi Man Adareyi
 Aşk Laftan Anlamaz as Thamath Adare Naththanm
 Siya Ke Ram as Rama Seeta Ravana
 Brahmarakshas as Adara Mayawa
 Kesari Nandan as Diriya Doni
 Natchwatch as Chanchala Maya
 RadhaKrishn as Krishna

International cartoon series broadcast
 Ben 10
 Shaun the Sheep as Sellanda Shaun 
 Pluto
 Master Raindrop as Diya Dagaya 
 Miraculous Ladybug as  Rathu Chooti 
 Roll No 21 as Soora Weera Batta
 Krishna Aur Balram
 Kumbh Karan as Thadiyay Kadiyay
 Robin Hood: Mischief in Sherwood as Robin Hood
 Zorro:The Chronicles as Zorro
 Guru Aur Bhole as Guru Ko Bole
 ViR: The Robot Boy as Viki The Robot Boy
 Lassie as Lassie

See also
Digital Television
DVB-T2
1080p
Full HD

External links
 Hiru TV Official Website

References 

Asia Broadcasting Corporation
Sinhala-language television stations
Television channels and stations established in 2012
2012 establishments in Sri Lanka